The flag of the Organisation of Islamic Cooperation is white with the organization's emblem in the center, which consists of a green shade and globe, with the Kaaba at the center of the globe. The elements of the emblem reflect the organization's corporate philosophy according to their new statutes.

In 2011 this replaced the earlier flag, adopted in 1981, which featured a green background with an upward-facing red crescent enveloped in a white disc in the center; inside the disc, the words "Allahu Akbar" were written in Arabic calligraphy.

See also
Green in Islam
Flag of the Arab League
Flag of the Turkic Council

References

Organisation of Islamic Cooperation
Flags including Arabic script
Organisation of Islamic Cooperation
Organisation of Islamic Cooperation